The Our Lady of Bethlehem Cathedral, also known as Guarapuava Cathedral, is a historical Catholic cathedral located in Guarapuava, Paraná state, Brazil.

It is the headquarters of the Catholic Diocese of Guarapuava (Dioecesis Guarapuavensis or Diocese de Guarapuava) in the ecclesiastical province of Curitiba. The diocese was created in 1965 through the bull "Christi vices" of Pope Paul VI.

See also
Roman Catholicism in Brazil
Our Lady of Bethlehem

References

Roman Catholic cathedrals in Paraná (state)
Guarapuava